Throwing sports, or throwing games, are physical, human competitions where the outcome is measured by a player's ability to throw an object.

The two primary forms are throwing for distance and throwing at a given target or range. The four most prominent throwing for distance sports are in track and field: shot put, discus, javelin, and the hammer throw. Target-based sports have two main genres: bowling and darts, each of which have a great number of variations.

History
Throwing sports have a long history. Modern track and field comes from a lineage of activities that dates to the Ancient Olympic Games. Artwork from Ancient Greece, in the form of friezes, pottery and statues, attests to the prominence of such sports in the society's physical culture.

Bowling games have similarly ancient roots. Games based on throwing stone balls in Ancient Egypt date to 5000 BCE, and a form of bocce is documented in Ancient Rome. The game of catch (throwing and catching an object between players) is among the most basic of all games and is a key component of many modern, complex sports and games. Its dodgeball variant is a basic throwing game where the opponent is the target.

Projectiles used in such sports are highly varied. Common projectile types include balls, darts, sticks, discs and rings. Formalised throwing sports often have strictly defined criteria for projectiles, such as a pre-determined size and weight. Less formalised games are usually not as strict and some games (for example, pitching pennies and horseshoes) incorporate everyday objects into the game, reflecting the simplistic roots of the pastimes.

Most throwing sports use a defined field of play (including an area players may throw an object from, and an area where the object should fall) and a specific throwing method. Common one-armed throwing methods include overhand throwing (releasing with the arm above the shoulder) and underarm throwing (releasing with the arm below the shoulder). With both arms, overhead throwing and chest-passing are common actions. The type of throw used is highly influenced by the properties of the projectile: small, heavy objects are held and pushed away from the body (e.g. shot put); handled objects are swung and released with one or two hands (e.g. weight throw, keg toss); smaller, lighter objects such as balls and darts tend to use an extended overarm technique where distance or speed is required, and an underarm technique where greater precision is required. In these sports, most throws are taken from a static position or limited area. However, some sports do include a short run-up to the throw line, for example javelin throw and ten-pin bowling.

Standardised throwing sports typically have high-level competitions across regions and a sports governing body, with the most common and international varieties having a world championship and a professional circuit. Those that are less standardised in format tend not to have highly organised competition and instead are played in a more casual or social setting. Throwing games with prizes are common funfair and carnival games, with varieties including ring toss and coconut shy games.

The act of throwing is an element of many sports, particularly ball games – such as handball, basketball and codes of football – and bat-and-ball games, such as cricket and baseball. The throwing of an opponent is also a key feature of some martial arts and grappling sports. In these sports, the throwing aspect is just one part of a more complex system of rules. As throwing ability does not in itself determine the outcome, these are not strictly defined as throwing sports.

List of throwing sports

Throwing for distance

Track and field
Discus throw (Olympic sport)
Hammer throw (Olympic sport)
Javelin throw (Olympic sport)
Shot put (Olympic sport)
Weight throw (former Olympic sport)
Throws pentathlon – a combined track and field event comprising the above five events
Club throw (Paralympics)
Frisbee
Boomerang
Dwarf-tossing
Keg-tossing
Mobile phone throwing
Sheaf toss
Softball throw
Stone put
Steinstossen

Two-handed throwing

In events where one hand is used to throw the object, a "two-handed" contest may be staged wherein each competitor's score is the sum of the distance thrown with left and right hand. Such contests were staged at the 1912 Olympics (in discus, shot, and javelin) and at the Women's World Games in the 1920s.

Target sports

Board targets
Axe throwing
Darts
Knife throwing
Disc golf

Bowling
Alley bowling
Ten-pin
Nine-pin
Five-pin
Candlepin bowling
Duckpin bowling
Kegel
Trick bowling
Turkey bowling
Boules
Basque bowls
Bocce
Bocce volo
Boccia
Bolas criollas
Bolo palma
Jeu provençal a.k.a. boule lyonnaise
Bowls a.k.a. lawn bowls
Pétanque
Taistelupetankki

 Skittles
Bunnock
Finnish skittles
Fowling
Gorodki
Kubb
Mölkky

 Aunt Sally
 Bean bag throwing
 Cherokee marbles
 Chunkey
 Coconut shy
 Cornhole
 Horseshoes
 Irish road bowling
 Ladder toss
 Lawn darts
 Milk bottle pyramid
 Pitching pennies
 Ring toss
 Quoits
 Svaika
 Tin can alley
 Washer pitching

Other varieties
 Caber toss – a competitor throws a large pole (the caber), which must fall pointing away from the thrower
 Catch – a basic throwing game, where players throw and catch an object between one another
 Dodgeball – players try to strike opponents with a ball to eliminate them
 Keep away – catch game where players must keep the object away from another player
 Flying disc games – a genre of throwing sports based on flying discs, and containing a large number of games and rule-sets
 Stone skipping⁣ – competitors skip stones on water for both distance and number of skips

See also

List of jumping activities
Juggling
Running

References

 
Throwing
Games of physical skill
Sports by type
Articles containing video clips